Thierry Michels (born 27 August 1960) is a French politician of La République En Marche! (LREM) who served as a member of the French National Assembly from 2017 to 2022, representing Bas-Rhin's 1st constituency.

In parliament, Michels served as member of the Committee on Social Affairs and the Committee on European Affairs. From 2019, he was also a member of the French delegation to the Franco-German Parliamentary Assembly.

Michel did not seeking re-election in the 2022 French legislative election.

See also
 List of deputies of the 15th National Assembly of France

References

1960 births
Living people
Deputies of the 15th National Assembly of the French Fifth Republic
La République En Marche! politicians
21st-century French politicians
Politicians from Strasbourg
Members of Parliament for Bas-Rhin

University of Ottawa alumni
ESCP Europe alumni